The Minimanual of the Urban Guerrilla is a book written by Brazilian Marxist–Leninist revolutionary Carlos Marighella in 1969. It consists of advice on how to disrupt and overthrow an authoritarian regime, aiming at revolution. The text has been banned in many countries, but remains in print and on bookshelves in several others, including the United States.

The minimanual was written to be short and concise. It describes ways and strategies for a successful revolution, like the Cuban and Chinese ones.

Published five years after the 1964 rise of the Brazilian dictatorship and just one year after the worldwide 1968 student rebellions, and at a time where hopes for international revolution among left-wing militants and intellectuals were at their highest, the minimanual became an important tool and reference point for Marxist–Leninist guerrillas, and was also studied extensively by national liberation movements and organizations such as Sandinistas.

References

External links 

  
  Minimanual of the Urban Guerrilla on marxists.org
  Mini-Manual do Guerrilheiro Urbano on marxists.org
  Manuel du guérillero urbain

1969 non-fiction books
Political books
Urban guerrilla warfare handbooks and manuals